Brian Gilmore (born 1 December 1929) is a former Australian rules footballer who played with Essendon and St Kilda in the Victorian Football League (VFL).

Gilmore was recruited from Koondrook, a town on the Victorian side of the Murray River. A follower, Gilmore started out in the seconds in 1949, then in 1950 broke into the seniors for the first time. He made 11 league appearances in his time at Essendon, never more than four in a single season and was a member of the club's 1950 and 1952 seconds premierships.
 
In 1954, Gilmore joined Richmond, where he played briefly in the seconds, before leaving for Kyneton.

He spent the 1955 VFL season with St Kilda and put together 10 games that year, all in succession, a run which ended when he was forced to sit out four weeks for striking Carlton's Noel O'Brien.

Also a professional runner, Gilmore competed in the Stawell Gift and once won the quarter mile race.

References

1929 births
Australian rules footballers from Victoria (Australia)
Essendon Football Club players
St Kilda Football Club players
Kyneton Football Club players
Living people